This article provides information on candidates who stood for the 2010 Tasmanian state election.

Retiring Members

Labor
 Jim Cox MP (Bass)
 Steve Kons MP (Braddon)

Liberal
 Michael Hodgman MP (Denison)
 Sue Napier MP (Bass)

House of Assembly
Sitting members at the time of the election are shown in bold text. Tickets that elected at least one MHA are highlighted in the relevant colour. Successful candidates are indicated by an asterisk (*).

Bass
Five seats were up for election. The Labor Party was defending two seats. The Liberal Party was defending two seats. The Tasmanian Greens were defending one seat.

Braddon
Five seats were up for election. The Labor Party was defending three seats. The Liberal Party was defending two seats.

Denison
Five seats were up for election. The Labor Party was defending three seats. The Liberal Party was defending one seat. The Tasmanian Greens were defending one seat.

Franklin
Five seats were up for election. The Labor Party was defending three seats. The Liberal Party was defending one seat. The Tasmanian Greens were defending one seat.

Lyons
Five seats were up for election. The Labor Party was defending three seats. The Liberal Party was defending one seat. The Tasmanian Greens were defending one seat.

See also
 Members of the Tasmanian House of Assembly, 2006–2010

References

External links
Media Release: candidates Announced, Tasmanian Electoral Commission
Team Bartlett
Tasmanian Liberals: Your Liberal candidates
Tasmanian Greens

Candidates for Tasmanian state elections